Gladstone railway station is located on the Crystal Brook-Broken Hill line in Gladstone, South Australia.

History
Gladstone station opened in 1876 when a line opened from Port Pirie in the west, it was later extended east to Peterborough and ultimately Broken Hill. In 1888, a line was built north to Laura and ultimately Wilmington. When the Hamley Bridge line from Balaklava in the south reached Gladstone in 1894, it became a four-way junction station. All were built as narrow gauge lines.

In 1927, the line from the south was converted to broad gauge, making Gladstone a break of gauge station. As part of the standardisation project, the line between Port Augusta and Broken Hill was converted to standard gauge in 1969, thus Gladstone became a junction for three gauges.

By 1993, the lines to the north and south had closed, and today is only served by the standard gauge Crystal Brook-Broken Hill line.

Services
Journey Beyond's weekly Indian Pacific service between Sydney and Perth passes through Gladstone but does not stop.

References

External links

Flickr gallery
Johnny's Pages gallery 

Railway stations in South Australia
Railway stations in Australia opened in 1876